The Irish film industry has grown somewhat in recent years thanks partly to the promotion of the sector by Fís Éireann/Screen Ireland and the introduction of heavy tax breaks. According to the Irish Audiovisual Content Production Sector Review carried out by the Irish Film Board and PricewaterhouseCoopers in 2008 this sector, has gone from 1,000 people employed six or seven years ago, to well over 6,000 people in that sector now and is valued at over €557.3 million and represents 0.3% of GDP. Most films are produced in English as Ireland is largely Anglophone, though some productions are made in Irish either wholly or partially.

According to an article in Variety magazine spotlighting Irish cinema, a decade ago the Republic of Ireland had only two filmmakers anyone had heard of: Neil Jordan and Jim Sheridan. , the Republic of Ireland can boast more than a dozen directors and writers with significant and growing international reputations. Ireland is now achieving critical mass of filmmaking talent to match the kind of influence, disproportionate to its small size, that it has always enjoyed in the fields of literature and theatre.  Following in the footsteps of Sheridan and Jordan comes a generation that includes such directors as Lenny Abrahamson, Conor McPherson, John Crowley, Martin McDonagh, John Michael McDonagh, John Carney, Kirsten Sheridan, Lance Daly, Paddy Breathnach and Damien O'Donnell and writers such as Mark O'Rowe, Enda Walsh and Mark O'Halloran.

Former Minister for Arts, Sport and Tourism Martin Cullen (2008–2010) said that “the film industry is the cornerstone of a smart and creative digital economy”. But as well as the concrete economic benefits that the Irish film industry brings in by way of cash investment from overseas and the associated VAT, PAYE and PRSI receipts, it has been noted that there are the soft benefits in terms of the development and projection of the Irish culture and the promotion of tourism.

Some of the most successful Irish films include The Wind That Shakes the Barley (2006), Intermission (2003), Man About Dog (2004), Michael Collins (1996), Angela's Ashes (1999), The Commitments (1991), Once (2007) and Notorious (2017). Mrs. Brown's Boys D'Movie (2014) holds the record for the biggest gross on the opening day of an Irish film in Ireland. Notorious (2017) on the other hand holds the record for highest grossing Irish documentary of all time.

In the past many films were censored or banned, owing largely to the influence of the Catholic Church with films including The Great Dictator (1940), A Clockwork Orange (1971) and Life of Brian (1979) being banned at various times, although virtually no cuts or bans have been issued in recent years, one as of August 2006.  The Irish Film Classification Office policy is that of personal choice for the viewer, considering his job to examine and classify films rather than censor them.

Ireland as a location 
The first fictional film shot in Ireland was Kalem Company's The Lad from Old Ireland (1910), which was also the first American film shot on location outside the United States. It was directed by Sidney Olcott, who returned the next year to shoot over a dozen films primarily in the small village of Beaufort, County Kerry. Olcott intended to start a permanent studio in Beaufort, but the outbreak of World War I prevented him from doing so.

The Irish government was one of the first in Europe to see the potential benefit to the exchequer of having a competitive tax incentive for investment in film and television, making use of a revised and improved version of its Section 481 tax incentive in 2015 which gives production companies a tax credit rate of 32% when making certain films. Other countries have recognized the success of Ireland's incentive scheme and matched it or introduced a more competitive tax incentive. After a long lobbying process, significant improvements were introduced to the Section 481 relief for investment in film projects in 2009 to boost employment in the industry and help re-establish Ireland as an attractive global location for film and television production.

Kevin Moriarty, managing director of Ardmore Studios in County Wicklow, believes Ireland is an attractive film location as there is now recognition for the quality of the output of the Irish film industry and a perception that Ireland is a viable film destination.

Prominent films that have been filmed in Ireland include The Quiet Man (1952), The Lion in Winter (1968), The First Great Train Robbery (1979), Excalibur (1981), Braveheart (1995), Reign of Fire (2002), King Arthur (2004), The Guard (2011), Star Wars: The Force Awakens (2015), and Star Wars: The Last Jedi (2017).

Cinemas in Ireland 

The first cinema in Ireland, the Volta, was opened at 45 Mary Street, Dublin, in 1909 by the novelist James Joyce.

Ireland has a high rate of cinema admissions (the highest in Europe).

There are several cinema chains operating in Ireland. Among them are ODEON Cinemas (formerly UCI/Storm Cinemas), Omniplex, IMC Cinemas (Both Omniplex and IMC are owned by the Ward Anderson group), Cineworld, Vue and Movies@Cinemas.

Studios 
Ardmore Studios was the first Irish studio, opening in 1958 in Bray, County Wicklow.

Animated films 

Ireland has been home to several noteworthy producers of animated films in recent years. Sullivan Bluth Studios was opened in 1979 as Don Bluth Productions, with its primary location in Dublin, to produce animated films by director Don Bluth and producer Morris Sullivan. Some films produced at Sullivan Bluth's Irish studio include 1988's The Land Before Time, 1989's All Dogs Go to Heaven (co-produced with UK-based Goldcrest Films) and 1991's Rock-a-Doodle. Many of these films competed favourably with productions by Walt Disney Pictures at the time. However, following a number of box-office flops in the early to mid-1990s, including 1994's Thumbelina and A Troll in Central Park and 1995's The Pebble and the Penguin, the studio soon declared bankruptcy and was closed in 1995.

Today, Ireland has a number of animation studios that produce television and commercial animation, as well as feature films and co-productions. Cartoon Saloon, founded in 1999 by Paul Young and Tomm Moore, is among the most prolific. It has produced the award-winning TV series Skunk Fu! as well as a feature film, 2009's The Secret of Kells, animated primarily with Traditional paper and pencil hand drawn animation and detailing a fictitious account of the creation of the Book of Kells. The film was nominated at the 82nd Academy Awards for Best Animated Feature. Since then, Cartoon Saloon had released a slate of critically acclaimed animated films such as Song of the Sea, released in 2014., The Breadwinner released in 2017  and Wolfwalkers in 2020.

Legislation 

The Film Act of 1980 set the foundation for an expanding Irish-based film industry. It provided, among other things, very advantageous tax advantages for film productions and resident foreign creative individuals. A number of world-renowned writers, including Len Deighton,  Frederick Forsyth, and  Richard Condon took advantage of the allowances, residing in Ireland for a number of years. The Film Act was the result of an initial collaboration between the Taoiseach, Jack Lynch, and Lynn Garrison, an aerial film director who shared a semi-detached house with Lynch. The Film Act became the basis for other national film acts throughout Europe and America.

Irish Film Board 
Bord Scannán na hÉireann/the Irish Film Board (IFB) is the national development agency for the Irish film industry investing in talent, creativity and enterprise. The agency supports and promotes the Irish film industry and the use of Ireland as a location for international production.

The Irish Film Board was set up in 1981 to boost the local industry, and one of its earliest supported projects was The Outcasts in 1982. After the infamous closure of the Irish Film Board in 1987, Irish stories and filmmakers continued to break through with considerable international success My Left Foot (Jim Sheridan), The Crying Game (Neil Jordan), The Commitments (Alan Parker) all made with non-Irish finance. The success of these projects coupled with intensive local lobbying led to the re-establishment of the Irish Film Board in 1993.

Many film critics point to the fact that the Irish Film Board's output has been poor, as most films which are chosen for funding do little or no business outside of the country, and are rarely popular in Ireland. However, IFB funded films like Intermission, I Went Down, Man About Dog, The Wind That Shakes The Barley, and Adam & Paul have proved popular with domestic audiences and have all done respectable business in Irish cinemas.
Both the Oscar-winning film Once and the Palme d'Or winner The Wind That Shakes the Barley have experienced international success over the last couple of years.  Once, which was made on a shoestring budget, took over $10 million at the US box office and over $20 million in worldwide ticket sales, while The Wind That Shakes the Barley was distributed theatrically in 40 territories worldwide.

Over the last four years Irish films have screened and won awards at the top international film festivals including Cannes, Sundance, Berlin, Toronto, Venice, London, Tribeca, Edinburgh and Pusan.

The Wind That Shakes The Barley won the prestigious Palme d'Or award for Best Film at the Cannes Film Festival in 2006, while Garage, directed by Lenny Abrahamson, picked up the CICEA Award at the Directors Fortnight at the festival in 2007.  After winning the Audience Award at the Sundance Film Festival in 2007, Once went on to win the Best Foreign Film prize at the Independent Spirit Awards in 2008 and an Academy Award for Best Original Song.  The Irish short film Six Shooter won the Academy Award for Best Short Film in 2006 while the short film New Boy was nominated for the same award in 2009.

In 2009 a record seven IFB funded films (Ondine, Perrier’s Bounty, Triage, A Shine of Rainbows, Eamon, Cracks, and Colony) had officially been selected for the Toronto International Film Festival.

Tony Keily has criticised the board's insistence on funding "uncommercial commercial cinema". Paul Melia has also criticised the IFB over its slowness in awarding funding.

The Minister for Arts, Sports and Tourism Martin Cullen addressed the issue of commercial success recently saying that “The film board offers the chance to make films for a small audience and not necessarily for big commercial success but which have real quality.  That offers opportunity to people who can go on to make their mark.  Whether that is the actors, the director or crew, many of the people who work on those films wouldn’t go on to success unless they had been given their first chance here.  People can only get experience by giving them the opportunity”.

2005 Top 10 poll 
In 2005 a Jameson Whiskey-sponsored poll selected the top 10 Irish films: the results are below.

 The Commitments (1991)
 My Left Foot (1989)
 In the Name of the Father (1993)
 The Quiet Man (1952)
 The Snapper (1993)
 Michael Collins (1996)
 The Field (1990)
 Intermission (2003)
 Veronica Guerin (2003)
 Inside I'm Dancing (2004)

Critically acclaimed Irish films released since this poll was taken include The Wind That Shakes the Barley, Once, The Secret of Kells, Song of the Sea,  Garage, The Guard, and Brooklyn.

Irish Film & Television Awards 
The Irish Film and Television Awards have been awarded since 1999, and in their current form since 2003. The Best Irish Film award winners have been:
 2003: Intermission
 2004: Omagh
 2005: Inside I'm Dancing
 2007: The Wind That Shakes the Barley
 2008: Garage
 2009: Hunger
 2010: The Eclipse
 2011: As If I Am Not There
 2012: The Guard
 2013: What Richard Did
 2014: Calvary
 2015: Song of the Sea
 2016: Room
 2017: A Date for Mad Mary
 2018: Michael Inside
 2019: Ordinary Love
 2020: Black '47
 2021: Wolfwalkers
 2022: An Cailín Ciúin

See also 

 Galway Film Fleadh
 Dublin International Film Festival
 Irish-language films
 List of films set in Ireland
 List of Irish films
 List of Irish film directors

References

Further reading
 Quinn, Bob (1980), Celtic Cinema and the Irish Experience, in Bold, Christine (ed.), Cencrastus No. 3, Summer 1980, pp. 11 & 12.

External links 
 IFTA on IMDB 
 Irish Film Board
 Irish Film Board Act 1980
 Irish Film Institute
 The Irish Film & Television Awards website
 Irish Film & Television Network
 The Irish in Film